The Secret of Giving: A Christmas Collection is Reba McEntire's twenty-third album, and second Christmas album, the follow-up to her 1987 album Merry Christmas to You.  The album features mostly new, original holiday tunes with only a couple of traditional favorites.  The children featured on "The Angels Sang" are actually the class of her son Shelby who was in the third grade at the time.  The album peaked at No. 10 on the Billboard country chart and is currently certified Gold by the RIAA.It has sold 940,000 copies as of December 2013 in the US, and over 1 million copies worldwide.

The album was followed by a CBS made-for-television movie also called  Secret of Giving.  The film starred McEntire and aired on Thanksgiving night in 1999.  It featured songs from the album as its soundtrack.

Track listing

Personnel 
 Reba McEntire – lead vocals, arrangements 
 Jimmy Nichols – keyboards, backing vocals 
 B. James Lowry – acoustic guitar
 Biff Watson – acoustic guitar
 Jeff King – electric guitar
 Brent Mason – electric guitar
 Jerry McPherson – electric guitar
 Terry Crisp – steel guitar
 Paul Franklin – steel guitar
 Richard "Spady" Brannan – bass guitar 
 Glenn Worf – bass guitar, upright bass
 Eddie Bayers – drums
 Paul Leim – drums
 Eric Darken – percussion
 Larry Franklin – fiddle
 Will Smith – autoharp
 Joe Chemay – backing vocals
 Liana Manis – backing vocals

Production 
 David Malloy – producer 
 Reba McEntire – producer 
 Derek Bason – engineer, digital editing 
 Kevin Beamish – engineer, mixing
 Daniel Kresco – engineer, assistant engineer, mix assistant 
 Steve Marcantonio – engineer
 J. R. Rodriguez – engineer, assistant engineer
 Alex Chan – assistant engineer 
 Scott McCutcheon – assistant engineer
 Patrick Murphy – assistant engineer
 Denny Purcell – mastering 
 Carole Ann Mobley – production coordinator 
 Cindy Owen – art direction 
 Karen Cronin – design 
 Ron Davis – photography 
 Sandi Spika – hairstylist, wardrobe 
 Narvel Blackstock – management

Chart performance

Album

Charted songs

Sales and certifications

References

1999 Christmas albums
Christmas albums by American artists
Reba McEntire albums
MCA Records albums
Albums produced by David Malloy
Country Christmas albums